Alessandro Attene (born 10 September 1977 in Recanati, Province of Macerata) is a retired Italian sprinter who specialized in the sprint.

Biography
He won four medals (three at senior level), at the International athletics competitions, two of these with national relays team. His personal best time is 45.35 seconds, achieved in the heats of the 2000 Summer Olympics in Sydney. He also competed at the 1997 and 2001 World Championships, the 2001 World Indoor Championships and the 2002 European Championships without ever reaching the final. He did win a silver medal in the 200 metres and gold medal in the relay 4x100 at the 2005 Mediterranean Games. He participated in  the Summer Olympics in 2000, he has 16 caps in national team from 1994 to 2005.

Achievements

National titles
He has won 3 times the individual national championship.
1 win in the 200 metres (2004)
2 wins in the 200 metres indoor (2001, 2002)

See also
 Italian all-time lists - 400 metres
 Italy national relay team

References

External links
 

1977 births
Living people
People from Recanati
Italian male sprinters
Athletics competitors of Fiamme Azzurre
Athletes (track and field) at the 2000 Summer Olympics
Olympic athletes of Italy
World Athletics Championships athletes for Italy
Mediterranean Games gold medalists for Italy
Mediterranean Games silver medalists for Italy
Athletes (track and field) at the 2005 Mediterranean Games
Mediterranean Games medalists in athletics
Universiade medalists in athletics (track and field)
Universiade bronze medalists for Italy
Italian Athletics Championships winners
Medalists at the 1999 Summer Universiade
Sportspeople from the Province of Macerata
20th-century Italian people
21st-century Italian people